Nogometni klub Bosna Visoko is a professional association football club from the city of Visoko that is situated in Bosnia and Herzegovina.

Currently, Bosna plays in the Second League of the Federation of Bosnia and Herzegovina (Group Center) and plays its home matches on Stadion Luke which has a capacity of 5,200 seats.

The club's greatest success was in the late 1990s. Guided by manager Ivo Ištuk, Bosna won the Bosnian Cup, Bosnian Supercup and made great results in the First League of Bosnia and Herzegovina, even almost winning it in the 1997–98 season.

History

Foundation
NK Bosna was founded in 1953 in the city of Visoko with the merging of local sides NK Jadran (1923) and NK Radnički (1934) into a single club. After spending a decade in the third-tier, the club got promoted to the Yugoslav Second League in 1963, which was the club's biggest achievement in the former Yugoslavia. Bosna again got promoted to the second league in 1978 after winning the Bosnia and Herzegovina Republic League. The club stayed in the league for three years, before being relegated in the 1980–81 season.

Success and downfall
In the 1995–96 (north) Second League of Bosnia and Herzegovina season, Bosna finished on 1st place and got promoted to the First League of Bosnia and Herzegovina.

The club had its biggest success in the late 1990s under the guidance of current manager Ivo Ištuk. In the 1997–98 First League of Bosnia and Herzegovina season, the club finished the first round on 1st place, but did not win the whole league as it succumbed in the group stage play-offs. The next season, Bosna had great success, as it won the 1998–99 Bosnia and Herzegovina Football Cup, the first trophy in the club's history and the next season, won the Bosnian Supercup in 1999.

After years of playing in the First League of Bosnia and Herzegovina, in the 1999–00 league season, Bosna got relegated to the First League of the Federation of Bosnia and Herzegovina.

In the 2000–01 season, alongside HNK Grude, Bosna got promoted back to the Premier League of Bosnia and Herzegovina. After two seasons of Premier League football, in the 2002–03 season, Bosna finished on last place and got relegated once again to the First League of FBiH.

Present

Since getting relegated from the top tier of Bosnian football again in May 2003, Bosna mostly played in the First League of FBiH, with three seasons of them also playing in the Second League of FBiH (center) (2011–12, 2013–14 and 2014–15) and the fourth (2019–20) season to be played.

For a short period, from January to May 2013, 17 years after leaving Bosna, Ivo Ištuk, the club's most successful manager in history came back to the club and managed the club in that period.

On 5 August 2014, Bosna and FK Sarajevo signed a cooperation agreement by which Sarajevo will loan its talented youngsters to the Visoko-based side and will have first-buy rights on all NK Bosna players. By signing this agreement, Bosna de facto became Sarajevo's farm team. The agreement was signed by Adis Hajlovac and Mirza Laletović on behalf of Bosna, and Abdulah Ibraković on behalf of Sarajevo.

In the 2016–17 First League of FBiH season, Bosna throughout the whole season held 1st place and were really close to coming back to the Bosnian Premier League, but at the end of the season they failed to finish 1st as bad results costed them the promotion. At the end they finished 2nd, six points off champions NK GOŠK Gabela and only two points more than 3rd place FK Tuzla City, at that time still known as FK Sloga Simin Han.

On 5 April 2017, almost four years after leaving the club, Ivo Ištuk once again came back to Bosna and became the new manager. In July 2019, he left the club after over two years as its manager.

In the 2018–19 First League of FBiH season, Bosna for a third time in the club's history got relegated to the Second League of FBiH (center).

Honours

Domestic

League
First League of Bosnia and Herzegovina:
Winners (1): 1997–98 (First Round)
First League of the Federation of Bosnia and Herzegovina:
Winners (1): 1995–96 
Runners-up (1): 2016–17
Second League of the Federation of Bosnia and Herzegovina:
Winners (2): 2011–12 , 2014–15 
Bosnia and Herzegovina Republic League:
Winners (1): 1977–78

Cups
Bosnia and Herzegovina Football Cup:
Winners (1): 1998–99
 Runners-up (1): 1999–2000
Supercup of Bosnia and Herzegovina:
Winners (1): 1999

Club seasons

Club officials

Coaching staff
{|
|valign="top"|

Other information

Notable players
 Slaviša Vukičević
 Faruk Ihtijarević
 Almedin Hota
 Elvir Rahimić
 Mirsad Bešlija
 Esmir Džafić
 Kenan Hasagić

Managerial history
 Rajko Rašević (1977–1980)
 Ivo Ištuk (June 1997 – January 2000)
 Faruk Kulović (1 July 2000 – 30 June 2004)
 Nermin Bukva (1 July 2007 – 30 June 2008)
 Jusuf Čizmić (1 July 2008 – 21 June 2009)
 Avdo Kurdija (21 June 2009 – 14 July 2011)
 Adnan Fočić (14 July 2011 – 28 January 2013)
 Ivo Ištuk (29 January 2013 – 12 May 2013)
 Avdo Kurdija (13 May 2013 – 30 June 2013)
 Emir Karahmet (1 July 2014 – 30 June 2015)
 Faruk Dedić (1 July 2015 – 4 April 2017)
 Ivo Ištuk (5 April 2017 – 3 July 2019)
 Faruk Dedić (3 July 2019 – 30 September 2020)
 Faruk Kulović (3 October 2020 – present)

See also
Football Association of Bosnia and Herzegovina
FK Sarajevo

References

External links
NK Bosna Visoko at Facebook

 
Association football clubs established in 1953
Bosna Visoko
Sport in the Federation of Bosnia and Herzegovina
Bosna Visoko
1953 establishments in Bosnia and Herzegovina
Sport in Visoko